National Creation is a Greek political alliance, founded in 2022, and is a coalition formed between Recreate Greece, New Right, and, formerly, National Agreement.

History
Founded in May 2022, it is led by Thanos Tzimeros and is self-identified as a citizen-centered political movement, with emphasis on the rebuilding of the Greek state.

The party initially started as Dimiourgia when Thanos Tzimeros and Failos Kranidiotis joined forces to create the party in early 2021. Then, after Constantinos Bogdanos was ousted from the New Democracy party, his political movement National Agreement merged with Dimiourgia. A few months later Bogdanos was expelled from National Creation by Tzimeros and Kranidiotis and founded the Patriotic Force for Change party.

Ideology and leadership 
The party identifies as right-wing and it promotes conservative ideas with emphasis on free-market economics, as did Recreate Greece and Nea Dexia, as well as a focus on anti-migration and anti-communist sentiments. Both Bogdanos and Tzimeros have described the Greek Communist Party as dangerous and stated that it must be outlawed. The party also classifies Islam as a threat.

References

External links

 Party website (in English)

2022 establishments in Greece
Political parties established in 2022
Liberal parties in Greece
Libertarian parties
Classical liberal parties
Far-right political parties in Greece
Nationalist parties in Greece
Neoliberal parties
Pro-European political parties in Greece